HANTRU-1 is a submarine communications cable system that connects the Reagan Test Site in the Kwajalein atoll to Guam. The cable was funded by $100 million from the US Army. Marshall Islands and Federated States of Micronesia arranged to add extensions to this trunk line for total of $30 million. It has cable landing points at:

 Guam
 Pohnpei, Federated States of Micronesia
 Reagan Test Site, Kwajalein
 Ebeye, Kwajalein
 Majuro, Marshall Islands

HANTRU-1 is named after owner Hannon Armstrong Capital LLC and operator Truestone LLC. The dedicated Micronesian fiber pair will have an ultimate capacity to transmit 16 10-Gigabit wavelengths. The HANTRU-1 extensions were completed in March 2010. Previously connectivity to these island nations was only available using satellite transmission.

Notes

Submarine communications cables in the Pacific Ocean
Marshall Islands–United States relations
Federated States of Micronesia–United States relations